Lyubomir Markov (born 14 August 1927) was a Bulgarian former boxer. He competed in the men's lightweight event at the 1952 Summer Olympics.

References

External links
 

1927 births
Possibly living people
Bulgarian male boxers
Olympic boxers of Bulgaria
Boxers at the 1952 Summer Olympics
Place of birth missing
Lightweight boxers